Lenglingen is a lake in the municipality of Lierne in Trøndelag county, Norway.  The  lake is fed by the lakes Holden and Gusvatnet, and the water from Lenglingen flows south into the lake Ulen.  The village of Mebygda lies on the southeastern shore of the lake.

References

Lierne
Lakes of Trøndelag